Eucamptognathus prasinus is a species of ground beetle in the subfamily Pterostichinae. It was described by Alluaud in 1897.

References

Eucamptognathus
Beetles described in 1897